Michael Crawford (born 1942) is an English actor and singer.

Michael Crawford may also refer to:
Michael Crawford (historian) (born 1939), numismatist and ancient historian
Michael Crawford (cricketer) (1920–2012), English cricketer
Michael Lindsay Coulton Crawford, Royal Navy submariner 
Mike Crawford (born 1974), former NFL and XFL linebacker
Michael Crawford, Canadian NDP candidate for the riding of Kamloops—Thompson—Cariboo in the 2008 Canadian federal election
Michael Crawford, a character from the soap opera The Young and the Restless